The Alaska Library Association (AkLA) is a professional organization for Alaska's librarians and library workers. It is headquartered in Fairbanks, Alaska. It was founded July 5, 1972, and became a 501(c)(3) nonprofit organization in 1997. 

AkLA has two active chapters, one in Anchorage and one in Juneau. AkLA publishes The Newspoke (1981 – present) for news about the association and The Sourdough (1969 – present) which is their professional journal. In addition they maintain a set of Culturally Responsive Guidelines for Alaska Public Libraries to guide libraries in appropriate services to indigenous patrons.

References

External links
 Alaska Library Association website

alaska
Libraries in Alaska

Non-profit organizations based in Alaska